The World, the Flesh, the Devil is a 1932 British crime film directed by George A. Cooper and starring Harold Huth, Isla Bevan and Victor Stanley. It was based on a play by Laurence Cowen. It was shot at Beaconsfield and Twickenham Studios as a quota quickie for release by RKO Pictures.

Synopsis
The screenplay concerns a lawyer who plans to murder an aristocrat and steal his inheritance.

Cast
 Harold Huth as Nicholas Brophy
 Isla Bevan as Beatrice Elton
 Victor Stanley as Jim Stanger
 Sara Allgood as Emme Stanger
 James Raglan as Robert Hall
 Fred Groves as Dick Morgan
 Frederick Leister as Sir James Hall
 Felix Aylmer as Sir Henderson Trent
 Barbara Everest as Mrs Brophy

References

Bibliography
 Chibnall, Steve. Quota Quickies: The Birth of the British 'B' Film. British Film Institute, 2007.
 Low, Rachael. Filmmaking in 1930s Britain. George Allen & Unwin, 1985.
 Wood, Linda. British Films, 1927-1939. British Film Institute, 1986.

External links

1932 films
1932 crime films
British films based on plays
Films directed by George A. Cooper
British black-and-white films
British crime films
1930s English-language films
1930s British films
RKO Pictures films
Films shot at Beaconsfield Studios
Films shot at Twickenham Film Studios
Quota quickies